The Arab Revolutionary Workers Party ( Hizb Al-'Amal Al-Thawriy Al-'Arabi) is a political party active in Iraq and Syria. As of 2008 the general secretary of the party is Abdul Hafiz Hafiz. As of 2011, the chairman of the party is Tariq Abu Al-Hassan.

The party rejected the Ba'athist ideology of Michel Aflaq as reactionary and backward-looking. Instead the party opted for scientific socialism. Another early prominent leader of the party was Ali Salah Saadi. This split in the Ba'ath Party emerged parallel to the growth of leftist dissent in the Arab Nationalist Movement.

The party was active in Lebanon during the 1970s. During the initial years of the Lebanese Civil War (1975–76), al-Hafiz lived in Beirut. Al-Hafiz died in Beirut in October 1978.

During the "Damascus Spring", the initial period of Bashar al-Assad's rule, the party could meet somewhat undisturbed under the guise of the 'Left Forum'. The party, along with other left-wing groups in Syria, decided to boycott the 2003 parliamentary election. The party was one of the forces behind the National Democratic Gathering and the Damascus Declaration.

The party is part of the Syrian opposition and was active in the civil uprising phase of the Syrian Civil War. On June 30, 2011 the party took part in forming the National Coordination Committee for Democratic Change. A politburo member of the party, Hazem Al-Nahhar was included in the leadership of the Association. On October 10, 2011 the party decided to withdraw from the Coordination, but retained its commitment to working with the National Democratic Rally.

References

1966 establishments in Iraq
1966 establishments in Syria
Arab nationalism in Iraq
Arab nationalism in Syria
Arab socialist political parties
Ba'ath Party breakaway groups
Political parties established in 1966
Political parties in Iraq
Political parties in Syria
Socialist parties in Iraq
Socialist parties in Syria
Syrian opposition
Transnational political parties